Paglesham is a village  and civil parish in the north east of the Rochford Rural District, Essex. The parish includes two hamlets of Eastend and Churchend, which are situated near the River Crouch and Paglesham Creek.  It is part of the Roach Valley Conservation Zone.

At the Eastend is The Plough and Sail Public House. There is an unmade road (Waterside Road) full of large potholes leading to a boatyard on the River Roach. There are a small number of houses.

At Churchend is St Peter's Church. There are a small number of houses and a farm.  The Punch Bowl Inn is closed but poised to reopen in the Summer of 2022.

The two hamlets form one of Essex's oldest fishing villages and the area was once renowned as a smuggling centre. This included being home to one of the more famous smugglers in the region, Hard Apple, who was actually the parish councillor and local constable William Blyth.

Admiralty records show that the celebrated vessel HMS Beagle, in which Charles Darwin circumnavigated the world, ended its days as a static ship in the river near Paglesham Eastend, guarding against smugglers. It is speculated that the keel of the vessel may yet survive, buried in the mud of the riverbank.

Paglesham was also an old civil parish, connected to Rochford.

Village sign
The Paglesham village sign which stands by the approach road was designed and made by resident Rodney Choppin in response to a general initiative to mark the Millennium by Rochford District Council, and the decision to commission a village sign was taken by the Parish Council. It was erected in September 2000. The sign is made from hardwood, hand-carved and then painted. The post is English Oak from Thetford Forest. The pictures represent the agricultural and seafaring traditions of the village. Flanking the Essex shield underneath, are a Pagle (or Cowslip), and an Oyster shell.

Cultural references
The town was the focus of Julie Christie's character in the film Heaven Can Wait with Warren Beatty. It was also the setting for Garry Kilworth's children's novel The Raiders.

References

External links

Paglesham Parish Council

Villages in Essex
Civil parishes in Essex
Rochford District